During the German occupation of the Netherlands between 1940 and 1945, during the Second World War, Allied air forces carried out a number of operations over Rotterdam and the surrounding region. They included bombing strategic installations; leaflet-dropping; and during, the last week of the war, dropping emergency food supplies.

In one incident, during a raid on the shipyards and dock area, the United States Army Air Forces accidentally bombed a residential area and killed hundreds. Until the 1990s, the raid that took place on 31 March 1943 was not mentioned in local school history lessons about the region's war time experiences. In the runup to the 50th anniversary of the raid, newspaper articles and a television documentary by Mr. van der Wel broke the taboo, and the raid is now acknowledged with a memorial in a local park to the "Forgotten Bombardment".

History
Allied air forces (primarily the Royal Air Force and the United States Army Air Forces) carried out scores of raids on Rotterdam and the surrounding area. About half the raids were within the city limits, the others being clustered around Nieuwe Waterweg, Schiedam (shipyards) and Pernis (petrochemical industries and fuel storage tanks). During the 128 raids casualties amounted to 884 killed and a further 631 wounded.

An attack on the city of Rotterdam on 31 March 1943 was made by 102 USAAF bombers. The target was the shipyards and dock area, in the west of Rotterdam. The bombing took place at 12:25 (BST) in cloudy conditions, and only 33 B-17s dropped 99 tons of bombs.  The industrial area between Keilehaven and Merwehaven was hit. "A combination of strong wind and overcast conditions also caused great damage to the nearby residential areas, especially in the Bospolder-Tussendijken District". The death toll was between 326 and 401 and made between 10,000 and 20,000 people homeless. The bombardment became known as the "Forgotten Bombardment". Gijzing Park contains a memorial in remembrance of those killed and maimed by the attack (the monument was created by Mathieu Ficheroux and was unveiled by Dutch Prime Minister Ruud Lubbers on 31 March 1993).

Timeline

See also
 German bombing of Rotterdam

Notes

References

Further reading
 —  another Dutch memorial with the same name.

Rotterdam
Battles in South Holland
History of Rotterdam
1944 in the Netherlands
1945 in the Netherlands
Netherlands in World War II
Rotterdam
Rotterdam
Rotterdam
World War II strategic bombing of the Netherlands
20th century in Rotterdam